Cook is an electoral district in Queensland, Australia.

Cook covers the vast Cape York Peninsula north of Cairns, including the resort town of Port Douglas and the Torres Strait Islands. It is named after British navigator James Cook, who charted the coast and landed on Possession Island – one of the Torres Strait islands – in 1770.

History

1883 election
In the 1883 election, there were four candidates for the (then) two-member electorate. They were:
 Thomas Campbell
 Frederick Cooper (one of the sitting members)
 John Hamilton
 Charles Lumley Hill (a former member in Gregory)

Cooper and Hamilton were elected, but there were allegations of "ballot stuffing", specifically that there were too many votes cast at the California Gully and Halpin's Creek polling stations given the number of electors. The unsuccessful candidates, Campbell and Hill, petitioned to overturn the ballot. In December 1883, arrests were made in connection with the ballot stuffing. On 4 March 1884, the Elections and Qualifications Committee determined that Frederick Cooper should not be elected and that Thomas Campbell should be elected instead.

1884 by-election
On 4 August 1885, Thomas Campbell resigned after having been declared insolvent. Charles Lumley Hill won the resulting by-election on 16 September 1885.

1888 election
At the 1888 election, Cook returned to being a single-member electorate. Of the two sitting members, Hamilton contested the seat but Hill did not, saying that he was retiring from politics. However, Hill did not retire, but instead contested the election in Port Curtis, but he was unsuccessful. Hamilton was elected in Cook.

Members for Cook

Election results

References

External links
 Electorate profile (Antony Green, ABC)
  — 1931 history of the electorate

Cook